Baseball Québec is the provincial governing body for baseball in the Canadian province of Quebec.

Levels
Ligue de Baseball Senior Élite du Québec (Senior Men's - over 21)
Ligue de Baseball Élite du Québec (Junior Elite - under 21)
Junior (AA, BB) - Under 21
Midget (AAA, AA, A, B): 16–18 years old
Bantam (AA, A, B): 14–15 years old
Pee-Wee (AA, A, B): - 12–13 years old
Mosquito (AA, A, B): 10–11 years old
Atom (A, B): 8–9 years old

References

Baseball in Quebec
Organizations based in Montreal
Baseball governing bodies in Canada
Sports governing bodies in Quebec